Telaprolu railway station (station code:TOU), is an Indian Railways station in Telaprolu village of Andhra Pradesh. It lies on the Vijayawada–Nidadavolu section of Howrah–Chennai main line and is administered under Vijayawada railway division of South Central Railway zone. It halts for 10 trains every day.

History
The southern part of the East Coast State Railway (from Waltair to Vijayawada) was taken over by Madras Railway in 1901.

Electrification
The Mustabad–Gannavaram–Nuzvid–Bhimadolu sector was electrified in 1995–96.

Classification 
In terms of earnings and outward passengers handled, Telaprolu is categorized as a Non-Suburban Grade-6 (NSG-6) railway station. Based on the re–categorization of Indian Railway stations for the period of 2017–18 and 2022–23, an NSG–6 category station earns nearly  crore and handles close to  passengers.

References

External links
South Central Railway

Railway stations in Krishna district
Vijayawada railway division
1893 establishments in India